Cambarus davidi, also known as the Carolina ladle crayfish, is a species of crayfish in the family Cambaridae. It is endemic to central North Carolina, where it is restricted to the upper Neuse and Cape Fear river basins.

References

Further reading 

Cambaridae
Freshwater crustaceans of North America
Endemic fauna of North Carolina